Jackson Township is one of nine townships in Decatur County, Indiana. As of the 2010 census, its population was 988 and it contained 419 housing units.

History
Jackson Township was organized in 1834.

Geography

Unincorporated towns
 Alert
 Forest Hill
 Sardinia
 Waynesburg
(This list is based on USGS data and may include former settlements.)

Adjacent townships
 Clay Township (north)
 Sand Creek Township (east)
 Sand Creek Township, Jennings County (south)
 Geneva Township, Jennings County (southwest)
 Clifty Township, Bartholomew County (west)
 Rock Creek Township, Bartholomew County (west)
 Haw Creek Township, Bartholomew County (northwest)

Major highways
  Indiana State Road 3

Cemeteries
The township contains six cemeteries: Lower Union, Mount Olivet, Mount Pisgah, Shirk, Wesley and Wynn.

References
 
 United States Census Bureau cartographic boundary files

External links

 Indiana Township Association
 United Township Association of Indiana

Townships in Decatur County, Indiana
Townships in Indiana
Populated places established in 1834
1834 establishments in Indiana